Grietje is a Dutch feminine given name. It is a short form and diminutive of Margaretha. It was a common name, but its use has declined steadily since about 1900. The fairy tale Hansel and Gretel is called Hans en Grietje in Dutch. People with the name include:

Grietje "Gré" de Jongh (1924–2002), Dutch sprinter
Grietje Terburg Rowley (1927–2015), American Latter-day Saint hymn writer
Grietje "Gretha" Smit (born 1976), Dutch speed skater
Grietje Staffelt (born 1975), German politician
Griet Van Vaerenbergh  (born 1982), Belgian volleyball player
Grietje Vanderheijden (born 1978), Belgian actress
Grietje Zelle (1876–1917), Dutch exotic dancer and courtesan better known as Mata Hari

See also 
 2049 Grietje, an asteroid in the asteroid belt named after Grietje Haring-Gehrels

References

Dutch feminine given names
Given names derived from gemstones